The San Gorgonio Pass, or Banning Pass,  is a  elevation gap on the rim of the Great Basin between the San Bernardino Mountains to the north and the San Jacinto Mountains to the south. The pass was formed by the San Andreas Fault, a major transform fault between the Pacific plate and the North American plate. The tall mountain ranges on either side of the pass result in the pass being a transitional zone from a Mediterranean climate west of the pass, to a Desert climate east of the pass.  This also makes the pass area one of the windiest places in the United States, and why it is home to the San Gorgonio Pass wind farm.

It serves as a major transportation corridor between the Greater Los Angeles region and the Coachella Valley, and ultimately into Arizona and the United States interior. Both Interstate 10, and the Union Pacific Railroad, utilize the pass.  When the rail line was completed in January, 1883, by the Southern Pacific Railroad, it was billed as the second U.S. transcontinental railroad.

San Gorgonio Mountain, taller but farther away and less visible, is at the northern side of the pass, and Mount San Jacinto is on the southern side. Mount San Jacinto has the fifth-largest rock wall in North America, and its peak is only six miles south of Interstate 10. The pass is also referred to as the Banning Pass due to the town of Banning being located about 6.5 miles east of the pass summit. The city itself was named for Phineas Banning who founded the town.

Geology
The pass is the major geologic divide between the igneous batholithic Peninsular Ranges and the Transverse Ranges, which is a massive fault block composed of diverse forms of rock. According to Yule 2009, the pass is the single "largest discontinuity along the San Andreas fault".  One active branch of the San Andreas Fault passes through the San Gorgonio Pass roughly parallel and just to the north of interstate 10. Active parts of the Banning, the Garnet Hill and the San Gorgonio Pass Thrust faults are associated with the San Andreas Fault through the Pass. Together, these faults accommodate strike-slip and reverse slip that contributes to both uplift of the San Bernardino Mountains and overall movement between the North American plate and the Pacific plate.

Geography

Climate
The San Gorgonio Pass area tends to get snow at least once or twice during the winter months, although it rarely sticks to hard surfaces, such as the freeway or city streets.

Topography
The San Gorgonio River runs through the pass, west to east, and joins the Whitewater River near the community of Whitewater at the northwest end of Coachella Valley.

Transportation
The Southern Pacific Railroad (now the Union Pacific) laid down tracks through the pass in 1875. Amtrak's Sunset Limited and Texas Eagle intercity passenger trains continue to run on the line in addition to several freight trains. Additionally, the Riverside County Transportation Commission is studying the establishment of daily passenger service from Los Angeles to the Coachella Valley, including at least one station in the San Gorgonio Pass area.

However, the heart of the pass is generally considered to be further east near Cabazon, where the passageway between the two mountain ranges is narrowest. Eastward from here, the route descends steeply towards the Coachella Valley, with the eastern end of the pass taken to be at the junction of Interstate 10 and State Route 111 near Whitewater Canyon. In 1952 an expressway was built through the pass, carrying U.S. Route 99, U.S. Route 70 and U.S. Route 60. There are still portions of the old U.S. 99 route between Whitewater Canyon and Cabazon. Main Street in Cabazon, Ramsey Street in Banning, 6th Street in Beaumont, and Roberts Road in Calimesa are all old sections of U.S. 99.

The Banning Municipal Airport, located in the pass, is a small public airport operated by the city of Banning.

Places in the San Gorgonio Pass

Populated places
Banning
Bonnie Bell
Beaumont
Cabazon
Calimesa
Cherry Valley
Highland Springs
Morongo Reservation

Places of interest
AC Dysart Equestrian Center
Bogart Regional Park
Cabazon Dinosaurs
Desert Hills Premium Outlets
Edward-Dean Museum & Gardens
Gilman Ranch
Highland Springs Resort/Ranch & Inn
Malki Museum
Morongo Casino, Resort & Spa
Museum of Pinball
Pacific Crest Trail
San Gorgonio Pass Wind Farm

Other notable facilities
Larry D. Smith Correctional Facility 
San Gorgonio Memorial Hospital

References

Bibliography
 Gunther, Jane Davies. Riverside County, California, Place Names; Their Origins and Their Stories, Riverside, CA, 1984. LOC catalog number: 84–72920.
 Lech, Steve. Along the Old Roads: A History of the Portion of Southern California that became Riverside County 1772-1893, Riverside, CA, 2004.

External links

San Gorgonio Pass Historical Society website

 
Mountain passes of California
Rail mountain passes of the United States
Landforms of Riverside County, California
Beaumont, California
Cabazon, California
Bradshaw Trail
Interstate 10
U.S. Route 99
U.S. Route 70
U.S. Route 60
Southern Pacific Railroad